Scarva ( meaning "shallow place, rough ford") is a small village and townland in County Down, Northern Ireland. It is at the boundary with County Armagh, which is marked by the Newry Canal. In the 2001 Census it had a population of 320.

Scarva is famous as the location of the "Sham Fight" Pageant on 13 July every year. The Pageant attracts thousands of members of the Royal Black Preceptory, a group related to the Orange Order, who come to march and stage a symbolic (sham) re-enactment of the 1690 Battle of the Boyne.

History

Places of interest 
The village has a park, with playing fields and well inhabited wildlife pond, scenic walks and wild fowl sanctuary.

People
Rear Admiral Charles Davis Lucas (1834–1914),  recipient of the Victoria Cross

Schools 
Scarva Primary School

Sport 
The local football club is Scarva Rangers, formed in 1972. Home matches are played at Scarva Park.

Transport
Scarva railway station opened on 23 March 1859.
 Scarva is on National Cycle Route 9, linking Belfast with Newry, and eventually Dublin.

References

External links

Villages in County Down
Townlands of County Down
Civil parish of Aghaderg